Sha Tau Kok Road is a road connecting Sha Tau Kok and Fanling in the New Territories, Hong Kong.

History
Sha Tau Kok Road is the only road access to Sha Tau Kok from Hong Kong since its construction in 1927. The road replaced Sha Tau Kok Railway as the connection between those areas.

See also

 List of streets and roads in Hong Kong
 Shek Chung Au

Sha Tau Kok
Fanling
Roads in the New Territories